The men's individual road race at the 1956 Summer Olympics in Melbourne, Australia, was held on Friday 7 December 1956. There were 88 participants from 28 nations. Of the 88 starters 44 rode the distance to the end. The event was won by Ercole Baldini of Italy, the nation's first medal in the men's individual road race. Arnaud Geyre took silver, France's first medal since back-to-back golds in 1936 and 1948. Alan Jackson's bronze was Great Britain's first medal in the event since 1896.

French and British officials protested against Baldini's victory, claiming that he was protected from the hot sun by the Olympic film unit van that drove alongside him, but the protest was upheld. The start of the race was delayed fifteen minutes when it was discovered that two 'unauthorised' Irish cyclists, Tom Gerrard and Paudie Fitzgerald were in the starting field. The two were removed and then "joined 200 supporters in passing out Irish nationalist literature."

Each nation could enter up to four cyclists; nations entering at least three cyclists had the scores of their best three finishers used for the team road race event.

Background

This was the fifth appearance of the event, previously held in 1896 and then at every Summer Olympics since 1936. It replaced the individual time trial event that had been held from 1912 to 1932 (and which would be reintroduced alongside the road race in 1996). Ercole Baldini was a "heavy favorite" after setting an amateur world record in the one-hour ride and winning the 1956 individual pursuit world championship.

Colombia, Ethiopia, Trinidad and Tobago, and Venezuela each made their debut in the men's individual road race; East and West Germany competed as the United Team of Germany. Great Britain made its fifth appearance in the event, the only nation to have competed in each appearance to date.

Competition format and course

The mass-start race was on a course that covered 11 laps of a 17.0665 kilometres circuit, for a total of 187.73 kilometres. The course was "a fairly hilly ride" with "two large climbs that both peaked at 12% grades, the second of which [was] over a full kilometre."

Schedule

All times are Australian Eastern Standard Time (UTC+10)

The day started mild, but it became "rather warm" during the afternoon.

Results

The race started "rather quiet," with pressure picking up from lap 3 to lap 5. Many riders fell behind in the heat during that stretch. Feeding was allowed in lap 5. There were not many falls during this race, but the most serious happened then, with a bag tangling in Trickey's wheel and resulting in a crash that eliminated him and Mengistou. Baldini separated from the pack in lap 8, with 50 kilometres left, and was not challenged the rest of the way as he only increased his lead. A pack of four riders competed for second through fifth places.

References

External links
 Official Report

Cycling at the Summer Olympics – Men's road race
Road cycling at the 1956 Summer Olympics